Hellimer is a commune in the Moselle department in Grand Est in north-eastern France.

Notable people
 Balthazar Alexis Henri Schauenburg, (also spelled Schauenbourg), was born in Hellimer on 31 July  1748 and died in Geudertheim on 1 September 1831) was a French general who served in the wars of the French Revolution and the Empire.

See also
 Communes of the Moselle department

References

External links
 

Communes of Moselle (department)